The 1998 Australian Touring Car Championship was an Australian motor racing competition open to 5.0 Litre Touring Cars, (also known as V8 Supercars). The championship, which was sanctioned by the Confederation of Australian Motor Sport as an Australian title, was contested over a ten-round series which  began on 1 February 1998 at Sandown International Motor Raceway and ended on 2 August at Oran Park International Raceway. The series was promoted as the "Shell Australian Touring Car Championship". The title, which was the 39th Australian Touring Car Championship, was won by Craig Lowndes.

Teams and drivers
The following teams and drivers competed in the championship. Entries listed as "L1" competed for the overall championship, whereas those denoted "L2" also competed for the Privateers' Teams Cup.

Race calendar
The championship was contested over a ten-round series with three races per round.

Points system
Points were awarded to the first twenty classified finishers in each race as follows:

Championship standings

Race three at the Calder round was abandoned before the start due to water lying on the track after a late afternoon storm.

Privateers' Team Cup
The Privateers' Team Cup was open top Level 2 teams competing with control tyres. Points were awarded on the same basis as for the actual Championship however competitors were required to nominate eight rounds at which they would compete and only their best six results from those rounds would be retained towards the Cup award. Two-driver teams were permitted to pool their points into a combined score.

The Cup was won by Lansvale Smash Repairs with the team's Holden VS Commodore driven by Trevor Ashby and Steve Reed.

References

External links
 Official V8 Supercar site
 1998 Racing Results Archive

Australian Touring Car Championship seasons
Australian Touring Car Championship